Ernest Mansfield Beechey (15 June 1886 – 23 December 1972) was a cricketer who played first-class cricket for Wellington between 1906 and 1919.

Beechey was a batsman whose only first-class century came in his last match in March 1919, when he made 180 against Auckland. He and Wiri Baker added 252 for the second wicket, including 194 between lunch and tea on the second day of the match. He was an excellent fieldsman, whether in the slips or in the outfield.

His 158 in a senior Wellington club match in 1907–08, characterised by powerful drives, was widely regarded as the best innings in the competition that season. In a non-first-class interprovincial match in 1910–11 he scored 112 for Wairarapa against Nelson, reaching his century in 61 minutes. He was secretary of the Wellington Cricket Association in 1913–14.

References

External links
 
 Ernest Beechey at CricketArchive

1886 births
1972 deaths
Cricketers from Masterton
New Zealand cricketers
Wellington cricketers
People educated at Wellington College (New Zealand)